Prince Wilhelm may refer to:
 Prince Wilhelm of Prussia (1783–1851)
 Prince William of Hesse (1787–1867)
 Wilhelm, Prince of Löwenstein-Wertheim-Freudenberg (1817–1887)
 Wilhelm, Prince of Hohenzollern (1864–1927)
 William of Albania (1876–1945)
 Wilhelm, German Crown Prince (1882–1951)
 Prince Wilhelm, Duke of Södermanland (1884–1965)
 Prince Wilhelm of Prussia (1906-1940)

See also
Prince William (disambiguation)